Delnaz is a feminine Indian Parsi  name meaning "loved of the heart". Many variations in the spelling of the name such as Dilnaz, Delnaaz, etc. exist but the pronunciation is the same.

People named Delnaz
Delnaaz Irani - Indian Actress
Dilnaz Akhmadieva - Kazakhastani Actress and pop singer
 Dilnaz Irani- Indian Actress
Delnaaz Irani - Indian-Australian Journalist